The 2022 MTV Video Music Awards Japan were held on November 2, 2022.

List of winners

Video of the Year 

 Sekai no Owari - Habit

Best Solo Artist Video – Japan:
Aimer – Zankyou Sanka

Best Solo Artist Video – International:
Harry Styles – As It Was
Best Group Video – Japan:
Official Hige Dandism – Mixed Nuts
Best Group Video – International:
Blackpink – Pink Venom
Best New Artist Video – Japan:
INI – Rocketeer
Best New Artist Video – International:
Måneskin – Supermodel
Best Rock Video:
Macaroni Enpitsu – Nandemonai yo,
Best Alternative Video:
Momoiro Clover Z – Mysterion
Best Pop Video:
Ryokuoushoku Shakai – Character
Best R&B Video:
Be First – Betrayal Game
Best Hip Hop Video:
Sky-Hi – Just Breathe feat. 3racha of Stray Kids
Best Dance Video:
Sekai no Owari – Habit
Best Collaboration Video:
Tokyo Ska Paradise Orchestra – Free Free Free feat. Ikuta Lilas
Best Story Video:
CreepHyp – Night on the Planet
Best Art Direction Video:
King Gnu – Sakayume
Best Visual Effects:
Fujii Kaze – Damn
Best Cinematography:
Radwimps – Ningen Gokko
Best Choreography:
The Rampage from Exile Tribe – Ray of Light
Inspiration Award Japan:
Bish
Artist of the Year:
Vaundy
Song of the Year:
Ado – New Genesis
Album of the Year:
Aimyon – Falling into Your Eyes Record
Group of the Year:
Sakurazaka46
MTV Dance The World Award:
Takanori Iwata
Best Live Performance:
JO1
MTV Breakthrough Song:
Da-ice – Star Mine
Best Buzz Award:
Ive
Rising Star Award:
XG
Daisy Bell Award:
Balloon – Pamela

References

2022 in Japanese music
2022 music awards